Oenanthe, known as water dropworts, oenanthes, water parsleys, and water celeries, are a genus of plants in the family Apiaceae. Most of the species grow in damp ground, such as in marshes or in water.

Several of the species are extremely poisonous, the active poison being oenanthotoxin. The most notable of these is O. crocata, which lives in damp, marshy ground, and resembles celery with roots like a bunch of large white carrots. The leaves may be eaten safely by livestock, but the stems, and especially the carbohydrate-rich roots are much more poisonous. Animals familiar with eating the leaves may eat the roots when these are exposed during ditch clearance: one root is sufficient to kill a cow, and human fatalities are also known. It has been referred to as the most poisonous of all British plants, and is considered particularly dangerous because of its similarity to several edible plants.

The species O. javanica, commonly known as Chinese celery or Japanese parsley (seri; not to be confused with mitsuba or Japanese wild celery, Cryptotaenia japonica) is edible and grown in several countries of eastern Asia, as well as in Italy and India, where the spring growth is relished as a vegetable.

Taxonomy and naming
"Oenanthe" is derived from the Greek oinos "wine" and anthos "flower", from the intoxication effect produced by hemlock water-dropwort.

The word "dropwort" refers to the tubers produced amongst the roots of certain species in the genus.

Species
, Kew's Plants of the World Online accepts 33 species of Oenanthe:

Identification

The following simplified key can be used to distinguish the six British water-dropworts, by eliminating them one by one. To use the key, a few terms are needed: bracts are small, leaf-like appendages at the bottom of the primary umbels; rays are the branches of the primary umbels; petioles are leaf stalks. Refer to the notes on the species pages to confirm the identification.

1. Plants with bracts and ovate leaflets... O. crocata

2. Plants with bracts and narrow leaflets, rays thickening in fruit... O. pimpinelloides

3. Plants with bracts and narrow leaflets, rays not thickening in fruit... O. lachenalii

4. No bracts, upper leaves with ovate segments... O. aquatica

5. No bracts, upper leaves with narrow segments, petiole hollow... O. fistulosa

6. No bracts, upper leaves with narrow segments, petiole solid, rays thickening in fruit... 
O. silaifolia

7. No bracts, upper leaves with narrow segments, petiole solid, rays not thickening in fruit... O. lachenalii

Sardonic grin
Scientists at the University of Eastern Piedmont wrote that they had identified hemlock water dropwort (Oenanthe crocata) as the plant responsible for producing the sardonic grin. This plant is a possible candidate for the "sardonic herb", which was a neurotoxic plant referred to in ancient histories. It was purportedly used for the ritual killing of elderly people and criminals in Nuragic Sardinia, in which they were intoxicated with the herb and then dropped from a high rock or beaten to death.

Fossil record
Oenanthe aquatica fossil fruit halves have been recorded from Upper Miocene of Bulgaria, Pliocene of Thuringia and the Pliocene and Pleistocene of Poland.

Gallery

References

External links
 

Apioideae
Taxa named by Carl Linnaeus
Apioideae genera